The 2019 X1 Racing League was the inaugural season of the X1 Racing League, a professional franchise-based motorsport series in India. The league began in November 2019 with six teams.

Teams and drivers

Calendar

References

2019 establishments in India
2019 in Indian motorsport